Hoffmanns's woodcreeper (Dendrocolaptes hoffmannsi) is a species of bird in the subfamily Dendrocolaptinae. It is endemic to Brazil, and occurs in two river drainages in the Amazon Basin south of the main course of the Amazon River.  Its natural habitat is subtropical or tropical moist lowland forests.

References

External links
Photo (through trees); Article worldbirds

Hoffmann's woodcreeper
Birds of the Amazon Basin
Endemic birds of Brazil
Hoffmann's woodcreeper
Taxonomy articles created by Polbot